Evaldas is a Lithuanian masculine given name. Notable people with the name include:

Evaldas Petrauskas (born 1992), Lithuanian boxer
Evaldas Dainys (born 1982), Lithuanian basketball player
Evaldas Razulis (born 1986),  Lithuanian footballer

Lithuanian masculine given names